The Google Data Liberation Front is an engineering team at Google whose "goal is to make it easier for users to move their data in and out of Google products." The team, which consults with other engineering teams within Google on how to "liberate" Google products, currently supports 27 products. The purpose of the Data Liberation Front is to ensure that data can be migrated from Google once an individual or company stops using their services.

Google Takeout

On June 28, 2011, Google's Data Liberation Front engineering team released their first product, after 4 years in development, called Google Takeout, which allows a Google user to export data from supported services.

Data Transfer Project 

On July 20, 2018, Google's Data Liberation Front engineering team announced the Data Transfer Project in partnership with Facebook, Microsoft, and Twitter, an ecosystem which features data portability between multiple online platforms without the need of downloading and re-uploading data.

See also
Data portability
Data migration
Vendor lock-in
GDPR

References

External links
 Homepage
 Official Data Liberation Blog

Data Liberation Front